A. Köbis, which was launched in 1974, is a German motor yacht and former state yacht of the GDR. It was named after the sailor Albin Köbis, who was famous for his participation in a mutiny during the First World War. It is classed as a sports boat, and suited only to inland waterways. It has a large conference room but no sleeping cabins, with a capacity for 50 guests. It had a West German engine and a British radar system.

The yacht replaced the earlier  which was launched in 1952. Compared to its stylish wood-fitted predecessor, the yacht is a "plug-ugly, rectangular steel box", according to the GDR boat-building expert Uwe Giesler.

References

1974 ships
Ships built in East Germany
Royal and presidential yachts